Yazdan Shahr (also Romanized as Yazdanshahr; formerly, Yazdanabad (Persian: یزدان آباد), also Romanized as Yazdānābād and Yezdānābād) is a city and capital of Yazdanabad District, in Zarand County, Kerman Province, Iran.  At the 2006 census, its population was 5,037, in 1,149 families.

References

Populated places in Zarand County

Cities in Kerman Province